The 1972 United States Senate election in Kansas took place on November 7, 1972, concurrently with the U.S. presidential election as well as other elections to the United States Senate in other states as well as elections to the United States House of Representatives and various state and local elections.

Incumbent Republican U.S. Senator James B. Pearson defeated Democratic nominee Arch O. Tetzlaff with 71.42% of the vote.

Primary elections 
Primary elections were held on August 1, 1972.

Democratic primary

Candidates 
Arch O. Tetzlaff, anesthesiologist, unsuccessful candidate for Republican nomination for Kansas's 3rd congressional district in 1970

Results

Republican primary

Candidates 
Harlan D. House, farmer
James B. Pearson, incumbent U.S. Senator

Results

General election

Candidates 
James B. Pearson (R)
Arch O. Tetzlaff (D)
Gene F. Miller (C)
Howard Hadin (P), perennial candidate

Results

See also 
 1972 United States Senate elections

References

Bibliography
 
 

1972
Kansas
United States Senate